Sioned Harries (born 22 November 1989) is a Welsh rugby union player who plays back row for the Whitland RFC/Scarlets and the Wales women's national rugby union team. She won her first international cap against Australia in the 2010 Women's Rugby World Cup.

Playing career
Sioned Harries was born in Aberystwyth on 22 November 1989.

She played for Aberaeron school and Cardiff Metropolitan University before moving joining Whitland RFC, a feeder team for the Scarlets. Harris has been named captain for the Scarlets on several occasions. She has also played for the Ospreys. Outside of rugby, she is a physical education teacher.

Having played for the Wales women's national under-20 rugby union team, she was named in the squad for the national team at the 2010 Women's Rugby World Cup. While there, she made her debut against Australia as a flanker. But at a later game, against Sweden, she was moved to the back row, more recently she has been played in the second row.

She has continued to play for the Wales women's rugby union team, including at the 2014 Women's Rugby World Cup where she scored three times in the 35–3 victory over South Africa. Harris was in contention for the British team at the rugby sevens women's tournament at the 2016 Summer Olympics, but was not selected for the final squad. In addition, to the national rugby union team, she also plays on the Wales women's national rugby sevens team.

Harries was selected in Wales squad for the 2021 Rugby World Cup in New Zealand.

References

1989 births
Living people
Welsh female rugby union players
Wales international rugby union players
Ospreys (rugby union) players
Scarlets players
Rugby union players from Aberystwyth
Welsh educators
Women educators
Wales international women's rugby sevens players